Vicente López is a partido in the Buenos Aires metropolitan area, Buenos Aires Province, Argentina. It is one of the country´s most affluent municipalities.

Vicente López is located 20 kilometers north of downtown Buenos Aires and 80 kilometers north of the city of La Plata, the provincial capital. The partido incorporates several smaller neighborhoods, including Olivos, Florida and La Lucila.

Vicente López is known for its large residential areas, for being the seat of the Argentina presidential residence, and for its coastal park along the River Plate.

It has an estimated population of 269,420. Its 33km² makes Vicente López the smallest partido in the Buenos Aires Province and the second smallest municipality in Argentina.

Toponymy

The partido's name honors Vicente López y Planes, an Argentine writer and politician, the writer of the lyrics of the Argentine National Anthem, governor of Buenos Aires province (after the fall of Juan Manuel de Rosas) and then President of Argentina succeeding Bernardino Rivadavia.

López y Planes also composed El Triunfo Argentino, an ode to the resistance during the English invasion of Buenos Aires.
At the beginning it was thought to call it "Olivos", the name of the most important district of Vicente López.

Location
The partido is bordered by the city of Buenos Aires to the South, General San Martín Partido to the West, San Isidro Partido at the North and Río de la Plata to the East.

Districts

 Carapachay
 Florida
 Florida Oeste
 La Lucila
 Munro
 Olivos
 Vicente López
 Villa Adelina
 Villa Martelli

Demography
Vicente López is the 8th most populated Partido of Greater Buenos Aires. Most of the inhabitants are descendants of Italian and Spanish immigrants. There are also descendants of German, Polish, Ukrainian, Armenian and Croatian amongst other nationalities.

The partido has 280,929 inhabitants according to the 2010 Census.

Gallery

Notable residents
Josef Mengele, a German Schutzstaffel (SS) officer and physician during World War II

References

External links

Municipalidad de Vicente López 
Municipalidad de Vicente López at Google Cultural Institute

 
Populated places established in 1905
Partidos of Buenos Aires Province
1905 establishments in Argentina